Lachenal may refer to:

 Adrien Lachenal (1849–1918), Swiss politician
 Edmond Lachenal (1855-1948), French potter
 Marie Lachenal (1848-1937), English concertina performer
 Louis Lachenal (1921–1955), French climber
 Raoul Lachenal (1885-1956), French potter
Paul Lachenal (1884-1955), Swiss politician
François Lachenal (1918-1997) Swiss publisher and diplomat
 Lachenal & Co., British concertina manufacturer founded by Louis L. Lachenal around 1850